Shona McIsaac (born 3 April 1960) is a British Labour Party politician. She was the Member of Parliament (MP) for Cleethorpes from 1997 to 2010. She was defeated by Conservative candidate Martin Vickers in the 2010 election.

Early life 
McIsaac was born in Dunfermline, Fife in Scotland.

Before politics
She went to the SHAPE High School in Mons in Belgium, then Barne Barton Secondary Modern school in St Budeaux and Stoke Damerel High School for Girls in Stoke, Plymouth, which closed in 1986. She read for a BSc in Geography at St. Aidan's College of University of Durham, being taught by David Bellamy, and graduated in 1981.

She wrote and worked on women's weekly magazines, being deputy chief sub-editor of Bella, senior sub-editor of Chat and chief sub-editor of Woman.

Parliament
McIsaac started her political career as a councillor to the London Borough of Wandsworth in the Tooting ward in 1990. She was selected to stand for election for Labour in Cleethorpes through an all-women shortlist. She won the Cleethorpes seat with a majority of over 9,000, defeating Michael Brown, the sitting MP for the predecessor seat of Brigg and Cleethorpes. She was re-elected in 2001 with a majority of 5,620, and again four years later, finishing over 2,000 votes ahead of her Conservative rival.

She served as a Parliamentary Private Secretary to the Minister of State within the Department of Health.

McIsaac proposed a bill limiting the use of fireworks, and supported anti-fox hunting measures.

McIsaac was described as a 'government loyalist' and a "super loyal backbencher". According to the website TheyWorkForYou.com, McIsaac rarely rebelled against the Government, with the BBC stating "she regards it almost as a duty to support the government's agenda". She supported the Government in the vote on the war in Iraq.

In October 2009, following significant research, McIsaac launched a small campaign to raise awareness of the poor state of many of Britain's war memorials. Her principal case study was of the war memorial in Wold Newton, a small village in her constituency. She spoke on the subject in the House of Commons and an article appeared in the Telegraph.

In May 2010, she was defeated by Martin Vickers, losing by just over 4,000 votes. Following the general election, she blamed Gordon Brown personally on television for Labour's defeat.

Personal life
McIsaac lives in Cleethorpes with her husband Peter Keith, whom she married in 1994. Keith unsuccessfully contested the seat of Cleethorpes in 2015 and 2017.

References

External links
 Shona McIsaac MP
 Guardian Unlimited Politics – Ask Aristotle: Shona McIsaac MP
 TheyWorkForYou.com – Shona McIsaac MP
 Her voting record at the Public Whip
 BBC Politics profile

News items
 Demanding a ban on animals in circuses in 2006
 Assisting the extradition of Bob Kleasen in 2001

1960 births
Living people
Politicians from Dunfermline
Labour Party (UK) MPs for English constituencies
Female members of the Parliament of the United Kingdom for English constituencies
UK MPs 1997–2001
UK MPs 2001–2005
UK MPs 2005–2010
Councillors in the London Borough of Wandsworth
20th-century British women politicians
21st-century British women politicians
Alumni of St Aidan's College, Durham
20th-century English women
20th-century English people
21st-century English women
21st-century English people
Women councillors in England